Zhang Jie is a Chinese fencer.

He participated in the 1999 World Fencing Championships, winning silver medal for team foil, and participated in the 2001 Summer Universiade and the 2002 Asian Games, winning gold medals for team foil.

See also
Fencing at the 2000 Summer Olympics

References

Chinese male fencers
Living people
Asian Games medalists in fencing
Fencers at the 2002 Asian Games
Olympic silver medalists for China
Olympic fencers of China
Fencers at the 2000 Summer Olympics
Medalists at the 2000 Summer Olympics
Asian Games gold medalists for China
Medalists at the 2002 Asian Games
Year of birth missing (living people)
Olympic medalists in fencing